"The Producer" is the fourth episode of the third season of Gilligan's Island, in which the castaways stage a musical version of Hamlet. It first aired in on October 3, 1966.

Synopsis 
After curmudgeonly film producer Harold Hecuba (Phil Silvers) crash lands near the island during an around-the-world talent hunt, the castaways are forced to tolerate him until his rescue plane arrives. When Ginger asks him for a role in his next movie however, Mr. Hecuba laughs at the idea, causing Ginger to become so upset that she refuses to return to civilization with the rest of the castaways.

Hoping to change Mr. Hecuba's mind, Gilligan suggests that they perform a play for Mr. Hecuba so that he might reconsider Ginger's talent and ultimately decide to use her in a movie. From the limited resources available on the island, they create a musical version of William Shakespeare's Hamlet. The cast performs three songs for their show. These parody the "To be, or not to be" speech of act 3, scene 1; the "Get thee to a nunnery" exchange between Hamlet and Ophelia later in the same scene, and Polonius's "Neither a borrower nor a lender be" speech from act 1, scene 3.

The episode employs dialog taken directly from the original work and musical passages from the operas Carmen and The Tales of Hoffmann. Hamlet's soliloquy is done to the Habanera (aria), Ophelia adapts Belle nuit, ô nuit d'amour (the Barcarolle), and Polonius's advice is set to the Toreador Song:
Neither a borrower nor a lender be.
Do not forget: stay out of debt.
Think twice, and take this good advice from me:
Guard that old solvency!
There's just one other thing you ought to do.
To thine own self be true.

Hecuba awakens as the castaways rehearse at night, taking over the production.  When help arrives Hecuba departs alone, leaving behind all the others in order to take full credit for the musical version of Hamlet he intends to stage as his next project.

Cast 

In order of appearance:

 Hamlet: Gilligan
 Claudius: Thurston Howell III
 Gertrude: Mrs. Howell
 Ophelia: Ginger
 Polonius: The Skipper
 Laertes: Mary Ann

The show's only other regular character, The Professor, serves as the production's technical crew.

Reception 

Although the show Gilligan's Island seldom earned awards of any sort, "The Producer" was selected by TV Guide as one of the 100 greatest television episodes of all time.  In Gilligan Unbound: Pop Culture in the Age of Globalization, Paul A. Cantor terms the Hamlet production a "full-scale Broadway show" and notes the episode as "evidence of the degree of sophistication the castaways are able to achieve in their supposedly primitive state..."  Cantor also observes in an introduction to Hamlet that this episode is one of several recent examples that demonstrate the enduring popularity of Shakespeare's play, since audiences continue to recognize references to the centuries-old drama.  Cantor places the episode within the framework of a tradition of Hamlet parodies that dates back to the nineteenth century.  Yet Michael D. Bristol interprets these parodies, including the Gilligan's Island episode, as reflective of "a distinctively modern experience of subjectivity" in Shakespeare's version of the character.

Trivia 

 Part of the first song of the episode is featured in the Space Ghost Coast to Coast episode with Bob Denver, Dawn Wells, and Russell Johnson.
 In 1997 TV Guide ranked the episode number 52 on its '100 Greatest episodes of All Time' list.

References 

Producers, The
Works based on Hamlet